Big Ten volleyball is made up of the women's volleyball programs from the Big Ten's 14 member universities. Through 2021, the Big Ten has earned a combined 36 NCAA national semifinal appearances by eight different teams.  In 1987, Illinois became the first Big Ten program to make an appearance in the national semifinal. In 1999 Penn State won the conference's first national championship, and they have won seven overall, including a record four consecutive titles from 2007 to 2010.  Minnesota, Illinois, and Wisconsin (four times) have each made national championship game appearances.

In 2011, former Big 12 member Nebraska joined the Big Ten. The Cornhuskers have won five national championships, with two of these coming since the school joined the Big Ten.

Teams

† Since 1985, when double round-robin play was introduced
 * As a member of the Big 12

Big Ten Award History

Big Ten volleyball in the AVCA
The American Volleyball Coaches Association (AVCA) annually awards National Coach of the Year, Player of the Year, and Freshman of the Year. The following lists coaches and players from the Big Ten who have received these awards.

National Coach of the Year
1985 – Mike Hebert, Illinois
1990 – Russ Rose, Penn State
1995 – Chuck Erbe, Michigan State
1997 – Russ Rose, Penn State
2007 – Russ Rose, Penn State
2008 – Russ Rose, Penn State
2013 – Russ Rose, Penn State
2015 – Hugh McCutcheon, Minnesota

National Player of the Year
1994 – Laura Davis, Ohio State
1999 – Lauren Cacciamani, Penn State
2004 – Stacey Gordon, Ohio State
2008 – Nicole Fawcett, Penn State
2009 – Megan Hodge, Penn State
2014 – Micha Hancock, Penn State
2016 – Sarah Wilhite, Minnesota
2021 – Dana Rettke, Wisconsin

National Freshman of the Year
2001 – Stacey Gordon, Ohio State
2005 – Nicole Fawcett, Penn State
2006 – Megan Hodge, Penn State
2010 – Deja McClendon, Penn State
2014 – Ali Frantti, Penn State
2017 – Dana Rettke, Wisconsin
2020 – Emily Londot, Ohio State
2021 – Lexi Rodriguez, Nebraska

References

External links
Big Ten Volleyball

 
Women's volleyball leagues